Antoni Pizà, born in Felanitx, Mallorca, Spain, in 1962, is a musicologist. After receiving a PhD at the CUNY Graduate Center of City University of New York in 1994, he taught music history at Hofstra University in Long Island, at various colleges in CUNY, and at the Conservatorio Superior de Música de las Islas Baleares (Conservatory of Music and Dance, Palma). He is currently the director of the Foundation for Iberian Music and a member of the doctoral faculty in music at the Graduate Center of CUNY. Since the 2000s, he has curated a series of musical events at the Graduate Center featuring well-known musicians and authors, including Charles Rosen, Philip Glass, Claire Chase, David Harrington, Roger Scruton, Greil Marcus, Richard Taruskin, Paul Griffiths, and others.

Published works 
 Pizà, Antoni (2023). 
 
 
 
 
 
 
 
 
 
 
 
 
 
 
  Prologue by Luciano Pavarotti.

References

External links
Faculty biography for CUNY
CUNY COMMONS
CUNY Acedemic Works

Spanish musicologists
Living people
1962 births
People from Felanitx
City University of New York alumni
Hofstra University faculty
City University of New York faculty